Shenzhen Bay Park is a seaside urban park in Shenzhen, China.

The park occupies a 13-kilometre long stretch of reclaimed land along the southern coast of Shenzhen on the north shore of Shenzhen Bay (Deep Bay), starting west near Shenzhen Bay Bridge at Wanghai road and ending at the Hongshulin Nature Reserve. It spans much of the coastline of Nanshan and Futian districts. It runs along much of the length of Binhai and Binhe Boulevards and occupies an area of 108．07 hectares (267.0518 acres).

The park is divided into two sections, namely Shenzhen Bay Coastal Recreation Zone at its South West side and Hongshulin Coastal Ecological Park at its Eastern side. The latter is situated within the Hongshulin Nature Reserve, a habitat of numerous endangered bird species and is also known for its mangrove.

The entire area of the park opened on August 6, 2011, days before the 2011 Summer Universiade that took place in Shenzhen. The Hongshulin Coastal Ecological Park was opened earlier in December 2000. The entire length of the park is motor vehicle-free. Cycle paths and picnic spaces are featured along the park. The park offers a panoramic view covering the Shenzhen skyline and New Territories, Hong Kong.

See also
Shenzhen Bay Park station
List of parks in Shenzhen

References

Parks in Shenzhen